21 Winners: The Best Of Bob Marley and the Wailers is an album by Bob Marley and the Wailers, released on 14 August 1997 under the Madacy Entertainment record label. It includes twenty-one tracks.

Track listing 
 "Soul Rebel" (Bob Marley) – 3:15
 "Natural Mystic" (Marley) – 5:37
 "Memphis" (Chuck Berry) – 2:54
 "Soul Captives" (Marley) – 2:03
 "Don't Rock My Boat" (Marley) – 4:20
 "Rebel's Hop" (Marley) – 2:34
 "Duppy Conqueror" (Marley) – 3:34
 "Brain Washing" (Marley) – 2:16
 "You Can't Do That To Me" (Marley) – 2:46
 "Mr. Brown" (Gregory Isaacs, Marley) – 3:22
 "Sun Is Shining" (Marley) – 2:02
 "There She Goes" (Marley) – 2:40
 "Treat You Right" (Marcus Miller, Jimmy Norman) – 2:15
 "Fussing And Fighting" (Marley, Lee "Scratch" Perry) – 2:25
 "Trench Town Rock" (Marley) – 2:51
 "Soul Almighty" (Marley, Perry)
 "Corner Stone" (Marley) – 2:10
 "Keep On Moving" (Marley) – 3:02
 "Riding High" (Perry, Cole Porter) – 2:38
 "Soul Shakedown Party" (Marley) – 3:01
 "Soon Come" (Marley, Peter Tosh) – 2:16

References 

1997 greatest hits albums
Bob Marley and the Wailers compilation albums
Madacy Entertainment compilation albums